Hipólito, el de Santa ("Hippolytis the Saint") is a 1950 Mexican film. It was directed by 
Fernando de Fuentes and written by Luis Alcoriza.

Plot

Hipolito is a blind  cabaret pianist who comes to the  aid of  a young woman named Santa.  He hides from her the fact that he's blind because he doesn't want her pity.

Cast
José Luis Jiménez
Esther Fernandez
Jaime Jimenez Pons
Emma Roldan
Jose Torvay

References

External links
 

1950 films
1950s Spanish-language films
Films directed by Fernando de Fuentes
Mexican drama films
Mexican black-and-white films
1950 drama films
1950s Mexican films